Count Móric Esterházy de Galántha et Fraknó (27 April 1881 – 28 June 1960) was a Hungarian aristocrat and politician.

Life
He served as prime minister for a few months during World War I, after the fall of István Tisza. His attempts at reform were defeated by Tisza's conservative forces, and he quickly resigned, to be replaced by the weak administration of Sándor Wekerle. After the war he devoted himself to the management of his large estate. For the Christian Economic Party, he became a member of the Hungarian Parliament again in 1931 and a representative of his party in the important Economic Committee.

Family and ancestry
Móric Esterházy was the grandfather of football player Márton Esterházy (1956– ) and writer Péter Esterházy (1950–2016).

References 

1881 births
1960 deaths
People from Oroszlány
Prime Ministers of Hungary
Moric Esterhazy
Heads of government who were later imprisoned